David George (born 23 February 1976 in Cape Town) is a South African cyclist.  He cycled on the USPS team 1999-2000, and later for Barloworld. In 2003 he won the South African National Road Race Championships. He also competed at the 1996 Summer Olympics, the 2000 Summer Olympics and the 2008 Summer Olympics.

Doping
In 2012, he tested positive for the blood boosting drug EPO by the South African Institute for Drug-Free Sport after biological passport anomalies were detected, and admitted his use of EPO. He was later given a two-year ban for his offence and lost his victory in the Cape Pioneer Trek mountain bike race.

Major results

1999
 2nd Overall Giro del Capo
2000
 7th Overall Redlands Bicycle Classic
2001
 South African Time Trial Champion
2002
 1st Overall Giro del Capo
 1st Stage 5 ITT
 3rd Overall Tour de Langkawi
2003
 South African Road Race Champion
 1st Overall Giro del Capo
 1st Stage 5 ITT
2004
 South African Time Trial Champion
 1st Overall Giro del Capo
2005
 5th Overall Giro del Trentino
2006
 South African Time Trial Champion
 1st Overall Tour de Langkawi
 1st Stage 4 Giro del Capo
 2nd Commonwealth Games Road Race
2007
 South African Time Trial Champion
 3rd Overall Giro del Capo
 1st Stage 4 
 4th Overall Tour de Langkawi
2008
 5th Overall Giro del Capo
 1st Stage 5
2010
 1st Overall Giro del Capo
 1st Stage 4 ITT

References

External links

David George's profile on Cycling Base

Doping cases in cycling
1976 births
Living people
South African male cyclists
South African sportspeople in doping cases
Sportspeople from Cape Town
Commonwealth Games medallists in cycling
Commonwealth Games silver medallists for South Africa
Commonwealth Games bronze medallists for South Africa
Cyclists at the 1998 Commonwealth Games
Cyclists at the 2006 Commonwealth Games
White South African people
Olympic cyclists of South Africa
Cyclists at the 1996 Summer Olympics
Cyclists at the 2000 Summer Olympics
Cyclists at the 2008 Summer Olympics
20th-century South African people
21st-century South African people
Medallists at the 1998 Commonwealth Games
Medallists at the 2006 Commonwealth Games